The 2nd U-boat Flotilla (German 2. Unterseebootsflottille), also known as the Saltzwedel Flotilla, was the second operational U-boat unit in Nazi Germany's Kriegsmarine. Founded on 1 September 1936 under the command of Fregattenkapitän Werner Scheer, it was named in honour of Oberleutnant zur See Reinhold Saltzwedel. Saltzwedel, a U-boat commander during World War I, died on 2 December 1917, when his submarine UB-81 was sunk by a mine in the English Channel.

The flotilla was based in Kiel for the first few weeks after its formation, but was later moved to Wilhelmshaven, where it remained until May 1940. In June 1940, the flotilla was moved to Lorient in France until it was disbanded in August 1944.

Flotilla Commanders

U-boats assigned to the flotilla

References 

 
Gordon Williamson. Wolf Pack: The Story of the U-Boat in World War Two, Osprey Publishing, 2005.

External links 
uboat.net – comprehensive website dedicated to U-boat history.

02
Military units and formations of the Kriegsmarine
Military units and formations established in 1936
Military units and formations disestablished in 1944